Ifako-Ijaiye is a city and local government area in Lagos, Nigeria. It has a land area of 43 square kilometers (17 sq mi) and had a population of 427,878 people in 2006.

The current Executive Chairman is Prince Usman Akanbi Hamzat.

History 
The Ifako-Ijaiye Local Government was created along with 183 other local governments on October 1, 1996 by General Sani Abacha, the then military head of state. It was carved out of Agege Local Government, with headquarters in Ifako. The 1991 census found the majority of inhabitants to be Yoruba.
Ifako-Ijaiye Local Government is a border suburb town as it shares border with Ogun State. The major settlements are Ogba-Ijaiye, Ifako, Oke-Ira, Iju-Ishaga, Obawole, Iju-Ogundimu, Fagba, Agege Pen Cinema, Ojokoro among others.

The past leaders of the Local Government are: Engr. Richard Akinpelu (late), Alh. Ma'rufdeen Adeola Adefolabi (late), Hon. Demola Doherty, Hon. (Apostle) Oloruntoba Oke (2011-2014), Hon Akinwunmi Nurudeen Olaitan (2014-2016), Hon Babatunde I.Q. Rajh-Label (2016-2017).

The Former Governor of Lagos State, Mr. Akinwunmi Ambode, appointed Babatunde I.Q. Rajh-Label as Sole Administrator of the Local Government in June 2016. The election was held on July 22, 2017 throughout the 20 Local Government Areas and 37 Local Council Development Areas of Lagos State. Hon (Apostle) Oloruntoba Oke was elected and sworn in as the Executive Chairman for a second term by the former State Governor, His Excellency, Gov. Akinwunmi Ambode.

The Local Government is at present being led by Hon. (Prince) Usman Akanbi Hamzat as the Executive Chairman, after a local government election held in July 2021.

Transport
The city is served by Agbado station, located in the Local Council of Agbado-Oke Odo and part of the Lagos Rail Mass Transit project.

Current Executives
Prince Usman Akanbi Hamzat - Executive Chairman

Hon. Mrs. Oluwatoyin Awoniyi Akerele - Vice Chairman

Past Chairman & Sole Administrators of Ifako Ijaiye Local Government
Engineer Adeoye Ogundipe - Acting Chairman - October 1996

Hon. Aremu Akindele - 1st Executive Chairman - March 1997

Hon. Ademola Taiwo - Sole Administrator - June 1998

Hon. Adeola Adefolabi - 2nd Executive Chairman - June 1998

Hon. Babatunde Odele - Executive Secretary - June 2002

Hon. Dr. Elijah Olu Adewale - Executive Secretary - April 2003

Hon. Richard A.A. Akinpelu - 3rd Executive Chairman - April 2004

Hon. Muzemil Olajide Tairu - Sole Administrator - August 2008

Hon. Demola Doherty - 4th Executive Chairman - October 2009

Apostle (Dr.) Oloruntoba Oke - 5th Executive Chairman - October 2011

Hon. Adeleye Rotimi - Executive Secretary - January 2015

Hon. B.I.Q. Rajh Label - Sole Administrator - June 2016

Sole Administrator's Activities So Far 

Commencement of The Local Government Headquarters Building in Ifako
Handed Over Landed Property For Primary School Development In Obawole
Commemoration of 20th Anniversary of The Local Government's Existence 
Free Computer Training Programme For Primary School Pupils
Rehabilitation of Bore Hole Water for School Students
Free Skill Acquisition Training Programme for Residents
Routine Peace And Security Meeting 
Routine Management Meeting
Monthly Environmental Sanitation Inspection Exercise
Grading of Local Roads
Training of Staff amongst others

Photo Gallery

References

External links
 https://www.facebook.com/UAH4FkjLG/

Local Government Areas in Lagos State
Local Government Areas in Yorubaland